Vincent Joseph Boryla (March 11, 1927 – March 27, 2016) was an American basketball player, coach and executive. His nickname was "Moose". He graduated from East Chicago Washington High School in 1944. He played basketball at the University of Notre Dame and the University of Denver, where he was named a consensus All-American in 1949. Boryla was part of the U.S team that won the gold medal at the 1948 Summer Olympics in London.

Boryla played for the New York Knicks in the early 1950s.  In 1951, Boryla scored nine points in the inaugural NBA All-Star Game and played in the NBA Finals in 1951 and 1953. Boryla did not participate in the 1952 playoffs.  He later became the Knicks' coach from 1956 to 1958, and had an 80–85 record with them.

Later in his career, Boryla became the general manager of the American Basketball Association's Denver Nuggets early in their history when they were first the Kansas City ABA team and then the Denver Larks. He was also the general manager of the ABA's Utah Stars. Boryla later rejoined the Nuggets when the franchise joined the NBA. He won the NBA Executive of the Year Award with the Nuggets in 1985.

His son Mike was a quarterback in the National Football League; Vince served as his agent.

Boryla was inducted into the Indiana Basketball Hall of Fame, and in 1984 into the National Polish-American Hall of Fame. Boryla died in Denver, Colorado on March 27, 2016 from complications of pneumonia, aged 89.

NBA career statistics

Regular season

Playoffs

References

External links

Vince Boryla (as coach) Statistics at Basketball-Reference.com
National Polish-American Sports HOF profile

1927 births
2016 deaths
All-American college men's basketball players
Amateur Athletic Union men's basketball players
American men's basketball players
Basketball coaches from Indiana
Basketball players at the 1948 Summer Olympics
Basketball players from Indiana
Denver Pioneers men's basketball players
Medalists at the 1948 Summer Olympics
National Basketball Association All-Stars
National Basketball Association executives
New York Knicks head coaches
New York Knicks players
Notre Dame Fighting Irish men's basketball players
Olympic gold medalists for the United States in basketball
Power forwards (basketball)
Small forwards
Sportspeople from East Chicago, Indiana
United States men's national basketball team players
Utah Stars executives
Deaths from pneumonia in Colorado
American people of Polish descent